Chicago and Alton Depot, also known as the Illinois Central Gulf Depot, is a historic train station located at Marshall, Missouri, United States, that is listed on the National Register of Historic Places.

Description

The depot was designed by the architect Jarvis Hunt and built in 1906 by the Chicago and Alton Railroad. It is a one-story, brick and stone building with Jacobethan Revival and Mission Revival style design elements.  The building measures approximately 113 feet 2 inches in length and 42 feet 11 inches wide.

It was added to the National Register of Historic Places in 1979.

See also

 National Register of Historic Places listings in Saline County, Missouri

References

External links

Marshall
Railway stations on the National Register of Historic Places in Missouri
Mission Revival architecture in Missouri
Railway stations in the United States opened in 1906
Buildings and structures in Saline County, Missouri
National Register of Historic Places in Saline County, Missouri
Former railway stations in Missouri